This list of people from Palm Springs, California describes notable residents who have had homes in the city and nearby resort communities of the Coachella Valley. These communities, which include Palm Springs, Bermuda Dunes, Cathedral City, Coachella, Desert Hot Springs, Indian Wells, Indio, La Quinta, Palm Desert, Rancho Mirage and Thermal are in the Coachella Valley of Riverside County, southern California.

Palm Springs Walk of Stars

Over 410 of Palm Springs area notable residents have been honored with Golden Palm Stars on the Palm Springs Walk of Stars.

Presidents and heads of state
 U.S. Vice President Spiro Agnew and his wife Judy Agnew – retired to Rancho Mirage
 Dwight D. Eisenhower, U.S. President and his wife Mamie Eisenhower – had a retirement home in Palm Desert
 U.S. President Gerald Ford and his wife Betty Ford – retired to Rancho Mirage

Other Palm Springs residents

Early settlers (pre-World War I)

Show business – performers

Silent film era

Radio

Show business – production

Cinematographers and art directors

Studio executives

Artists, architects and photographers

Academics and scientists, authors and writers

Composers, musicians and singers

Business figures

Civic, political and labor leaders and noted personalities

Military personnel

Sports and recreation figures

Underworld (criminal) figures

Coachella Valley residents

Bermuda Dunes
 Rich Newey – multi-media director

Cathedral City

Coachella

Desert Hot Springs

Indio

Indian Wells

La Quinta

Palm Desert

Rancho Mirage

Thermal
 William Devane – actor

See also
 List of mayors of Palm Springs, California

Notes

References

Further reading
  
  – sequel to Johns' 2004 Palm Springs Confidential: Playground of the Stars!

External links

  – for the Palm Springs Walk of Stars
 

Palm Springs, California
Lists of people from California